Lennart Carlsson may refer to:
 Lennart Carlsson (racewalker)
 Lennart Carlsson (speed skater)